Russia–Tanzania relations are the bilateral relations between Russia and Tanzania. Both countries established diplomatic relations on December 11, 1961. Russia has an embassy in Dar es Salaam, and Tanzania has an embassy in Moscow.

Diplomatic interactions
In June 1995, a protocol on ministerial consultations, the next round of which was held in May 2009 in Dar es Salaam. In July 2008, on the sidelines of the G8 Summit in Japan, President Dmitry Medvedev and President Jakaya Kikwete held a brief conversation.

Economics
In March 2005, an agreement on cooperation between the Chambers of Commerce of both nations.

Military/security
In 2007, ten employees of the Ministry of Public Security of Tanzania were trained in educational courses of the Russian Interior Ministry.

Ambassadors

Ambassadors of Tanzania to Russia 
 Isaac Abraham Sepetu (1982-1989)
 William Lucas Mbago (1989-?)
 Eva Lilian Nzaro (1998-2002)
 Patrick Chokala (since 2002)

Russian/Soviet Ambassadors to Tanzania 
 Andrey Timoshchenko (1962-1969)
 Vyacheslav Ustinov (1969-1972)
 Sergey Slipchenko (1972-1980)
 Yuri Yukalov (1980-1985)
 Sergei Illarionov (1985-1989)
 Andrey Fialkovsky (1989)
 Vladimir Kuznetsov (1989-1992)
 Kenesh Kulmatov (1992-1997)
 Doku Zavgayev (1997-2004)
 Leonid Safonov (2004-2010)
 Alexander Early (since 2010)

See also
Foreign relations of Russia
Foreign relations of Tanzania

References

External links
  Documents on the Russia–Tanzania relationship from the Russian Ministry of Foreign Affairs
  Embassy of Russia in Dar-es-Salaam
  Embassy of Tanzania in Moscow

 
Tanzania
Bilateral relations of Tanzania
Tanzania